Boyse is a surname, and may refer to:

 Edward Boyse (1923–2007), British-born American physician and biologist
 Joseph Boyse (1660–1728), English Presbyterian minister in Ireland and controversialist
 Maurice Boyse (born 1955), former Australian rules footballer
 Samuel Boyse (1708–1749), Irish poet and writer